Francesco Negri (18 December 1841 – 21 December 1924) was an Italian photographer known not only as a pictorialist but for his innovative work in photomicroscopy, in the development of the telephoto lens, and for his early experiments in Louis Ducos du Hauron’s techniques of colour photography. His scientific and cultural pursuits included botany and local history: in both fields his publications remain significant. He served as Mayor of Casale Monferrato. In the meantime by profession he was a lawyer.

Biography
Negri was born in Tromello in Lomellina (PV) to Angelo Maria Negri and Maria Magnaghi who were well-off and well-connected. He attended secondary school in Vigevano, then took a law degree in Turin, graduating in 1861. The following year he moved to Casale Monferrato where he married Giulia Ravizza and pursued a career in a civil law.

Negri died in Casale on 21 December 1924.

Published works
 Bergaglio, B. and Cavanna, P. (2006) Francesco Negri fotografo, 1841-1924. Milan: Silvana.

Notes

References
 Dettaglio articolo at www.inalessandria.it
 Il Monferrato – Home at www.ilmonferrato.it
 Text can be downloaded from Project Gutenberg  at The Note-Books of Samuel Butler by Samuel Butler.

Further reading
 Francesco Negri fotografo a Casale. Milano: Centro Informazioni Ferrania, Coop. Il Libro Fotografico, 1969.
 Barbara Bergaglio and Pierangelo Cavanna (editors), Francesco Negri fotografo 1841-1924. Milano: Silvana, 2006

1841 births
1924 deaths
People from the Province of Pavia
People from Casale Monferrato
Pioneers of photography
Italian photographers